Sunpendulum is an art, science and technology project  devised by Austrian media artist Kurt Hofstetter.

Concept 
Watching the sky: "Inplusion" phase
Twelve video cameras called "time-eyes" are connected to the internet in twelve locations in twelve time zones around the Earth, observing the sky twenty four hours per day, continuously creating a hypothetical "sun clock" which spans the planet.

Installations

 1999  Maui, Bermuda and Granada  
 2000  Cairo, New Orleans and Ensenada 
 2001  Azores 
 2002  Dubai
 2003  Hong Kong
 2004  Kolkata
 2005  Tokyo
 2006  Marshall Islands

Viewing the results: "Explosion" phase
→  Note: This section describes "pavilions" which have not been constructed or installed.

At a location to be determined within each time zone, twelve screens are intended to be arranged in a circle within a pavilion  meant to remain open for visitors twenty four hours per day.  The screens, connected online with the time-eyes, transmit the images from the twelve time zones.  As the earth rotates, the images transmitted by the time-eyes move within a pavilion's circle of screens where day and night may be vicariously experienced in parallel. 
 
Each pavilion, a circular structure of twenty four pairs of half cylinders where each pair resembles in horizontal cross section the Hopi symbol for universal brotherhood, is intended to allow twenty four points of entry for visitors while preventing local light from reaching the screens.  An arrangement of rooftop solar cells is hypothesized to produce the necessary energy.

Kernel team
The kernel team consists of scientists (chiefly from the Institute of Computer Graphics and Algorithms at the Vienna University of Technology) and artists.  Its primary tasks are ongoing technical developments which maintain the integrity of the project and its hardware and software.

Collaboration partners
The collaboration partners are scientific and academic institutions which host the time-eye cameras, hardware and servers and participate in the project's international cross-cultural cooperation.

 University of Hawaii and Maui Community College 
 Autonomous University of Baja California 
 University of New Orleans 
 Bermuda Underwater Exploration Institute 
 University of the Azores 
 University of Granada 
 Ain Shams University 
 Zayed University
 Jadavpur University
 Hong Kong University of Science and Technology
 Kanazawa Institute of Technology
 College of the Marshall Islands

References

External links 
  Institute of Computer Graphics and Algorithms (ICGA)  website.
  Bermuda Underwater Exploration Institute  (BUEI)  website.

Public art
Conceptual art
Contemporary works of art
Land art
Installation art works
Digital art